The 1929 Loyola Lions football team was an American football team that represented Loyola College of Los Angeles (now known as Loyola Marymount University) as an independent during the 1929 college football season. In their first and only season under head coach William L. Driver, the Lions compiled a 6–3 record.

Schedule

References

Loyola
Loyola Lions football seasons
Loyola Lions football